Barbro Charlotte Rohlin (born 2 December 1980) is a Swedish former footballer who played as a defender and captained Damallsvenskan club Linköpings FC. She won 77 caps for the Sweden women's national football team between 2007 and 2015.

Club career
Rohlin began playing for Linköpings in 1987, while they were still attached to BK Kenty, and progressed up through the youth teams. In 2009 Rohlin rejected an approach from Philadelphia Independence of the American Women's Professional Soccer (WPS), to extend her contract with Linköpings.

She decided to retire from football at the end of the 2015 season, taking a position in the club's marketing department. At the time of her retirement, Rohlin was the player with most appearances for Linköpings with more than 300 matches played in all competitions (232 of them in the league).

International career

At the 2007 edition of the Algarve Cup, Rohlin made her debut for the senior Sweden team in a 3–0 win over Finland. Her first appearance in the squad for a major tournament came at the 2008 Beijing Olympics.

She was selected for UEFA Women's Euro 2009 and scored Sweden's first goal at the tournament, in their 3–0 group stage win over Russia. Rohlin was also part of the team which secured third place at the 2011 FIFA Women's World Cup in Germany. She featured in Sweden's 3–1 semi-final defeat to eventual winners Japan in Frankfurt. Sweden secured third place by beating France 2–1 in Sinsheim.

Rohlin missed the 2012 London Olympics with an anterior cruciate ligament injury. After a year out, she returned to club football in spring 2013 and immediately targeted a place in Sweden's squad for UEFA Women's Euro 2013.

Although selected for the 2015 FIFA Women's World Cup, Rohlin was no longer first choice due to Nilla Fischer's switch to centre-back and the emergence of younger players such as Emma Berglund and Amanda Ilestedt. When Sweden performed poorly and crashed out without winning a game, Rohlin criticised the tactics of coach Pia Sundhage.

Matches and goals scored at World Cup & Olympic tournaments
Charlotte Rohlin appeared Sweden in one World Cup (Germany 2011) and one Olympic Games (Beijing 2008). She was on the roster for the 2007 and 2015 World Cups, but did not see playing time in either of those tournaments.

Matches and goals scored at European Championship tournaments
Charlotte Rohlin participated in two European Championship tournaments: Finland 2009 and Sweden 2013. She played every minute of both tournaments.

Honours

Club
 Linköpings FC
 Damallsvenskan (1): 2009
 Svenska Cupen (4): 2006, 2008, 2009, 2013–14
 Svenska Supercupen (2): 2009, 2010

National team
 Sweden
 Third place at the FIFA Women's World Cup: 2011

References

Match reports

External links

 
 
 Profile  at SvFF
 
 
 
Club Profile
 

1980 births
Living people
Swedish women's footballers
Footballers at the 2008 Summer Olympics
Olympic footballers of Sweden
Sweden women's international footballers
2011 FIFA Women's World Cup players
2015 FIFA Women's World Cup players
Damallsvenskan players
Linköpings FC players
Sportspeople from Linköping
Women's association football defenders
2007 FIFA Women's World Cup players
Footballers from Östergötland County